Ponomaryovsky (masculine), Ponomaryovskaya (feminine), or Ponomaryovskoye (neuter) is the name of several rural localities (villages) in Russia:
Ponomaryovskoye, a village in Orekhovskoye Settlement of Galichsky District of Kostroma Oblast
Ponomaryovskaya, Konoshsky District, Arkhangelsk Oblast, a village in Tavrengsky Selsoviet of Konoshsky District of Arkhangelsk Oblast
Ponomaryovskaya, Krasnoborsky District, Arkhangelsk Oblast, a village in Cherevkovsky Selsoviet of Krasnoborsky District of Arkhangelsk Oblast